Lower Machen is a small hamlet of 19 houses on the A468 road at the very western edge of the city of Newport, South Wales.

Machen itself lies further west in the county borough of Caerphilly, although both lie within the historic boundaries of Monmouthshire.

Lower Machen holds an annual festival of chamber music concerts in the 12th-century church of St. Michael and All Angels. Ruperra Castle is also located in Lower Machen. Lower Machen was formerly served by Church Road railway station, which closed in 1957. The Conservative politician, Peter Thorneycroft, lived at Machen House in the hamlet, during his time as Member of Parliament for Monmouth from 1945-1966.

St Michael and All Angels' Church 
It is believed that the church was founded during the Celtic period in the 6th century. The current building dates back to the 12th century. The church has connections with the Morgan family of the nearby Tredegar House in Newport. There are eleven hatchments connected with the family and the Morgan Family Chapel contains monuments to the family. Three of the hatchments appeared in BBC One's Antiques Roadshow broadcast on 23 November 2014 and were valued at around £3,000 each.

The church has eight bells which are rung at festivals and weddings.

References

External links

Lower Machen Festival - www.lowermachenfestival.co.uk - an annual chamber music festival founded in 1967
 City of Newport: Lower Machen Conservation Area
 St Michaels church website

Villages in Newport, Wales